Kržava may refer to:
 Kržava, Montenegro
 Kržava, Krupanj, Serbia